Marianne Muellerleile (born November 26, 1948) is an American actress.

Early life
Muellerleile was born in St. Louis, Missouri, the daughter of Margaret (née Keaney) and Cecil E. Muellerleile, an American football player, coach, and college athletics administrator and oil company executive.

Career 
Muellerleile played the role of Sophie, a waitress, in the movie Return to Me which was directed by and also starred Bonnie Hunt and then later appeared as a series regular on Bonnie's comedy series, Life with Bonnie as "Gloria", the housekeeper, for two seasons until the show ended. She also appeared in The WB television series Charmed episode "Primrose Empath". She also has a recurring role on the soap opera Passions, playing the disturbed character of Norma Bates. She also played the nanny on Melrose Place and a no-nonsense mother hosting a Halloween party on Highway to Heaven. She guest-starred in one episode of Will and Grace, in one episode of Anger Management and in one episode of How I Met Your Mother. In 1991, Muellerleile made her first appearance on the situation comedy Night Court as Miss Gilly; she would subsequently appear on the series three more times, as three different characters.

In the 1984 film The Terminator, she had a pivotal role as a woman named Sarah Connor, who is murdered by the Terminator because she shares the name of its target. Also in 1984, she appeared in the hit comedy film Revenge of the Nerds as the pedophilic woman who answers the door where Harold Wormser goes to ask about the room for rent. In 1994, she played the role of Diana Beaujolais in Saved By the Bell: Wedding in Las Vegas.

Muellerleile recurred as a nun-teacher "Sister Dominick" at the school of the characters Madeline Fitzpatrick and London Tipton in The Suite Life of Zack & Cody episodes, Forever Plaid, Books & Birdhouses and A Kept Man. 

She also recurred in Zeke and Luther as Nana Waffles, Luther's grandmother.

She voiced Mrs. Rudolph in W.I.T.C.H. and had a role in Smokin' Aces as Margie Turlock, where she treats shooting victim Hollis Elmore (Martin Henderson) after a botched drive-by attempt by the "Tremor Brothers". She's had memorable roles in films such as Memento, Thank You for Smoking, Norbit and Nina. Marianne later had a recurring role in the Disney Junior animated series The Rocketeer as Lucille.

In addition to TV and film, Marianne has an extensive resume in theater, commercials and print work.

Personal life
She married Air Force officer Joseph T. "Tom" Norris Jr. on May 7, 1988. She is a Roman Catholic and a registered Democrat.

Filmography

Film

Television

References

External links

Marianne Muellerleile ~ The Official Web Site

1948 births
American film actresses
American soap opera actresses
American television actresses
Living people
Actresses from St. Louis
20th-century American actresses
21st-century American actresses
Missouri Democrats
California Democrats
American Roman Catholics